The 1999 Uncensored was the fifth Uncensored professional wrestling pay-per-view (PPV) event produced by World Championship Wrestling (WCW). The event took place on March 14, 1999 from Freedom Hall in Louisville, Kentucky. The event is currently available on the WWE Network.

Storylines
The event featured professional wrestling matches that involve different wrestlers from pre-existing scripted feuds and storylines. Professional wrestlers portray villains, heroes, or less distinguishable characters in the scripted events that build tension and culminate in a wrestling match or series of matches.

Event

During the opening match for the WCW Cruiserweight Championship, Billy Kidman retained his championship against Mikey Whipwreck, in his debut match, following a Shooting Star Press. The second match saw Stevie Ray defeated Vincent in Harlem Street Fight for leadership of nWo Black and White.

During the next match, Kevin Nash defeated Rey Misterio Jr.  Lex Luger tripped Mysterio from ringside, which enabled Nash to hit a powerbomb for the pin. Following this, Jerry Flynn defeated Ernest Miller and Sonny Onoo in a handicap match. Following this, Hardcore Hak defeated Bam Bam Bigelow and Raven in falls Count Anywhere match via pinfall after Raven's sister Chastity hit Raven with a fire extinguisher.

The next match was a lumberjack match for the WCW World Tag Team Championship. Chris Benoit and Dean Malenko defeated Curt Hennig and Barry Windham for the championship. After Hennig knocked Arn Anderson off the ring apron, Anderson hit Hennig in the back of the head with a tire iron. Benoit following this up with a diving headbutt for the pin. The lumberjacks for the match, which all held leather straps, were: Norman Smiley, Hugh Morrus, Meng, Kenny Kaos, Arn Anderson, Kendall Windham, Bobby Duncum Jr. and Prince Iaukea.

Perry Saturn next defeated Chris Jericho in a dog Collar match.

In the WCW World Television Championship match, Booker T defeated Scott Steiner, to win the championship. Buff Bagwell, who had been with Steiner at ringside, accidentally hit Steiner with a steel chair, enabling Booker T to pick up the win via pinfall.

The main event was a barbed wire steel cage, first blood, match, for the WCW World Heavyweight Championship. Prior to the match, Flair agreed that should Hogan win, Flair would retire, however if Flair would win, he would be named WCW President for life. Ric Flair ultimately pinned Hollywood Hogan while an unconscious Hogan was in the Figure-Four leglock. David Flair and Torrie Wilson came to the ring and attempted to hand Hogan a tire iron, which provoked Arn Anderson to attack David Flair. Flair, who had gained control of WCW for 90 days on a December 1998 edition of WCW Monday Nitro, ordered referee Charles Robinson to use discretion in stopping the match; as a result, Robinson did not stop the match when Flair bled first, nor would he count for Hogans own pin falls. Charles Robinson made a fast three count to give the match to Flair.

Reception
In 2012, Jack Bramma of 411Mania gave the event a rating of 4.5 [Poor], stating, "Another bad show even if it's not the crime against humanity that is Uncensored 95. You got a solid tag match and Whipwreck throwing out all the stops to make a good impression on his first match but there's just so much trash here. Stay away for the most part."

Results

References

Professional wrestling in Kentucky
1999 in Kentucky
Events in Louisville, Kentucky
WCW Uncensored
March 1999 events in the United States
1999 World Championship Wrestling pay-per-view events